This list of the Mesozoic life of California contains the various prehistoric life-forms whose fossilized remains have been reported from within the US state of California and are between 252.17 and 66 million years of age.

A

  †Abyssochrysos – tentative report
 †Abyssochrysos giganteum – type locality for species
 †Acaeniotyle
 †Acaeniotyle umbilicata – or unidentified related form
 †Acanthoceras
 †Acanthoceras rhotomagense – or unidentified related form
 †Acanthoceras roguense – or unidentified related form
 †Acanthoceras sherborni – or unidentified comparable form
 †Acanthocircus
 †Acanthocircus aculeatus
 †Acanthocircus carinatus – or unidentified related form
 †Acanthocircus dendroacanthos
 †Acanthocircus dicranocanthos
 †Acanthocircus meyerhofforum
 †Acanthocircus multidentatus
 †Acanthocircus polymorphus
 †Acanthocircus suboblongus
 †Acanthocircus trizonalis
 Acanthosphaera – tentative report
 †Acanthosphaera lucida
 †Acastea
 †Acastea acer
 †Acastea bipes
 †Acastea dura
 †Acastea incontraria
 †Acastea remusa
 †Acastea tenuis
 Acesta
 Acharax
 †Acharax stantoni
 Acila
 †Acila demessa
 †Acila princeps
 †Acrioceras
 †Acrioceras hamlini
 †Acrioceras vespertinum
  †Acrodus
 †Acrodus wempliae – type locality for species
  †Acteon
 †Acteon inornatus
 †Acteon politus
 †Acteon sullivanae
 †Acteonella
 †Acteonella oviformis
 †Acteonina
 †Acteonina berryessensis – type locality for species
 †Acteonina californica
 †Acteonina columnaris
 †Acusten
 †Acusten ordinarius
 †Adelodonax
 †Adelodonax altus
 †Aechmella
 †Agnomyax
 †Agnomyax monilifer
 †Aguileria – or unidentified comparable form
 †Alarimella
 †Alarimella anae – type locality for species
 †Alarimella veta
  †Aletopelta – type locality for genus
 †Aletopelta coombsi – type locality for species
 †Alievium
 †Alievium antiquum
  Amauropsis
 †Amauropsis pseudoalveata
 †Ambercyclus
 †Ambercyclus dilleri
 †Ambercyclus morganensis
 †Amphidonte
 †Amphidonte parasitica
  †Ampullina
 †Ampullina avellana
 †Ampullina concipio
 †Ampullina mona
 †Ampullina oviformis
 †Ampullina packardi
 †Ampullina stantoni
 Amuletum
 †Anagaudryceras
 †Anagaudryceras mikobokense
 †Anagaudryceras sacya – or unidentified comparable form
 †Anahamulina
 †Anahamulina wilcoxensis
 †Anarhynchia
 †Anarhynchia gabbi – or unidentified comparable form
 †Anasibirites
 †Anasibirites desertorum
 †Anasibirites kingianus – type locality for species
 †Anasibirites lindgreni
 †Anatomites
 †Anatomites adalberti
 †Anatomites damesi
 †Anatomites edgari
 †Anatomites externiplicatus
 †Anatomites intermittens
 †Anatomites konnincki
 †Anatomites mendenhalli
 †Anatomites obsoletus – type locality for species
 †Anatomites shastensis – type locality for species
 †Anatomites subintermittens – type locality for species
 †Anatropites
 †Anatropites hauchecornei
 †Anchura
 †Anchura ainikta – type locality for species
 †Anchura baptos – type locality for species
 †Anchura californica
 †Anchura callosa
 †Anchura condoniana
 †Anchura falciformis
 †Anchura gibbera
 †Anchura halberdopsis – type locality for species
 †Anchura phaba – type locality for species
 †Anglonautilus
 †Anglonautilus catarinae
 †Angulobracchia
 †Angulobracchia bulbosa
 †Angulobracchia jasperensis
 †Angulobracchia ozvoldovae
 †Angulobracchia purisimaensis
 †Anisoceras
 †Anisoceras draconum
 †Anisomyon
 †Anisomyon meeki
 †Anomalina
 †Anomalina pseudopopillosa
  †Anomia
 †Anomia – type locality for species A – informal
 †Anomia jalama
 †Anomia lineata
 †Anoplophora – tentative report
 †Anoplophora shastensis – type locality for species
 †Anthonya
 †Anthonya cultriformis
 †Aphaea
 †Aphaea ignota
 †Aphanoptyxis
 †Aphanoptyxis andersoni
 †Aphanoptyxis californica – type locality for species
 †Aphrodina
 †Aphrodina varians
 †Aphrosaurus
 †Aphrosaurus furlongi
  Aporrhais
 †Aporrhais veta – type locality for species
 †Archaeocenosphaera
 †Archaeocenosphaera ruesti – or unidentified related form
 †Archaeodictyomitra
 †Archaeodictyomitra apiarium
 †Archaeodictyomitra inornata
 †Archaeodictyomitra oleadita
 †Archaeodictyomitra rigida
 †Archaeodictyomitra simplex
 †Archaeodictyomitra siplex
 †Archaeodictyomitra sliteri
 †Archaeodictyomitra vulgaris
 †Archaeohagiastrum
 †Archaeohagiastrum minutum – or unidentified related form
 Archaeolithothamnium
 †Archaeopus
 †Archaeopus antennatus
 †Archaeospongoprunum
 †Archaeospongoprunum carrierensis
 †Archaeospongoprunum cortinaensis
 †Archaeospongoprunum elegans – or unidentified related form
 †Archaeospongoprunum imlayi
 †Archaeospongoprunum klingi
 †Archaeospongoprunum macrostylum – or unidentified related form
 †Archaeospongoprunum praeimlayi
 †Archaeospongoprunum praelongum
 †Archaeospongoprunum tehamaensis
     Architectonica – tentative report
 Arcopagia
 †Arcopagia tehama
 Arctica
 †Arctica anthracocola
 †Arctica denmanensis – or unidentified related form
 †Arctoceras
 †Arctoceras tuberculatum
 †Areaseris
 †Areaseris nevadensis
    Argyrotheca
 †Argyrotheca retrorsa – type locality for species
  †Arnioceras
 †Arpadites
 †Arpadites kingi – type locality for species
 Arrhoges
 †Arrhoges californicus
 †Aspenites – type locality for genus
 †Aspenites acutus
 Astarte
 †Astarte sulcata – tentative report
 †Astarte sulcuta
 †Astarte tuscana
  †Asteroceras
 †Astrocoenia – report made of unidentified related form or using admittedly obsolete nomenclature
 Ataphrus
 †Ataphrus compactus – tentative report
 †Atira
 †Atractites
 †Atractites philippii – type locality for species
 †Atresius
 †Atresius liratus
 †Aucellina – tentative report
  †Augustynolophus
 †Augustynolophus morrisi
 Avicula
 †Avicula mucronata – type locality for species
 †Avicula soperi – type locality for species
 †Axonoceras

B

 †Bacchites
 †Bacchites hyatti – type locality for species
 †Bacchites pinguis
      †Baculites
 †Baculites anceps
 †Baculites bailyi – or unidentified comparable form
 †Baculites buttensis – type locality for species
 †Baculites capensis
 †Baculites chicoensis
 †Baculites fairbanksi
 †Baculites inornatus
 †Baculites lomaensis
 †Baculites occidentalis
 †Baculites recta – or unidentified comparable form
 †Baculites rex – type locality for species
 †Baculites schencki – type locality for species
 †Baculites yokoyamai – or unidentified comparable form
 †Bagotum
 †Bagotum modestum
 †Balantiostoma – tentative report
   Barbatia
 †Barrettia
 †Barrettia sparcilirata
  †Basilemys
 †Bathypurpurinopsis
 †Bathypurpurinopsis stantoni – type locality for species
 † Belleza
 †Belleza decora
 †Belliscala
 †Belliscala meta
 Bernaya
 †Bernaya argonautica – type locality for species
 †Bernaya berryessae – type locality for species
 †Bernaya crawfordcatei – type locality for species
 †Bernaya gualalaensis – type locality for species
 †Bernaya jeanae – type locality for species
 †Bernaya kayei – or unidentified related form
 †Bernaya louellasaulae – type locality for species
 †Bernaya popenoei – type locality for species
 †Bernaya rineyi – type locality for species
 †Bernoullius
 †Bernoullius brokenkettlensis
 †Bernoullius cristatus
 †Bernoullius delnortensis
 †Bernoullius dicera
 †Bernoullius irwini
 †Beudanticeras
 †Beudanticeras alamoense – type locality for species
 †Beudanticeras argonauticum – type locality for species
 †Beudanticeras breweri
 †Beudanticeras brewerii – or unidentified related form
 †Beudanticeras haydeni
 †Bipedis – tentative report
 †Biplica
 †Biplica heteroplicata
 †Biplica isoplicata
 †Biplica michaeli – or unidentified related form
 †Biplica miniplicata
 †Biplica multiplicata
 †Biplica obliqua
 †Bistarkum
 †Bittiscala
 †Bivallupus
 †Bivallupus mexicanus
 †Bochianites
 †Bochianites paskentaensis
 †Bolena
 †Bolena zancajosa
 †Bositra
 †Bositra buchi
  †Bostrychoceras
 †Bostrychoceras brewerii
 †Bostrychoceras californicum – type locality for species
 †Bostrychoceras declive
 †Bostrychoceras occidentale – type locality for species
 †Bostrychoceras otsukai – or unidentified related form
 †Brancoceras
 †Brancoceras parvum
 †Brasilichnium
 †Buchia
 †Buchia concentrica – or unidentified comparable form
 †Buchia elderensis
 †Buchia keyserlingi
 †Buchia pacifica
 †Buchia piochii
 †Buchia terebratuloides
 †Buchia trigonoides
 †Bulbificopsis – type locality for genus
 †Bulbificopsis garza – type locality for species
 Bulimina
 †Bulimina obtusa
   Bulimulus
 †Bullamirifica
 †Bullamirifica ainiktos
 †Bullamirifica elegans
 Bullaria
 †Bullaria nortonensis
  Bullina
 †Bullina yoloensis – type locality for species
 †Butticeras
 †Butticeras studleyi – type locality for species

C

 †Califadesma
 †Califadesma elaphium
 †Californigonia – type locality for genus
 †Californigonia plumasensis – type locality for species. Formerly classified as Trigonia plumasensis.
 †Californites – type locality for genus
 †Californites careyi – type locality for species
 †Californites merriami – type locality for species
   †Californosaurus
 Callianassa – tentative report
 †Calliconites
 †Calliconites drakei – type locality for species
 †Calliomphalus – tentative report
 Callista – tentative report
 †Callista pseudoplana – or unidentified related form
 †Callista subtrigona
 †Callistalox
 †Callistalox fragilis
 †Calva
 †Calva crassa
 †Calva elderi
 †Calva nitida
 †Calva peninsularis
 †Calva spissa
 †Calva taffi
 †Calva varians
   †Calycoceras
 †Calycoceras naviculare
 †Camptonectes
 †Camptonectes curvatus – or unidentified comparable form
 †Canadoceras
 †Canadoceras celeste – type locality for species
 †Canadoceras fraternum
 †Canadoceras mysticum
 †Canadoceras newberryanum
 †Canadoceras subtilobatum – or unidentified related form
  Cancellaria – tentative report
 †Canelonus
 †Canelonus conus
 †Caneta
 †Caneta hsui
 †Canoptum
 †Canoptum anulatum
 †Canoptum poissoni
 †Canoptum rugosum
 Cantharus
 †Cantharus occidentalis
 †Canutus
 †Canutus giganteus
 †Canutus rockfishensis
  Capulus – or unidentified comparable form
 †Capulus silverthorni – type locality for species
 Cardinia
 †Cardinia gleimi – type locality for species
 †Cardiomorpha – tentative report
 †Cardiomorpha digglesi – type locality for species
 Cardita
 †Cardita jenkinsi – type locality for species
 †Cassideus
 †Cassideus yoloensis
 †Cecrops
 †Cecrops septemporata
 †Cecrops septemporatus
 †Celtites
 †Celtites steindachneri
 Cenodiscus
 †Cenodiscus alievi
 Cenosphaera
 †Cenosphaera boria
 †Ceriostella
 †Ceriostella martini
  Cerithidea
    Cerithium
 †Cerithium alternata
 †Cerithium totiumsanctorum – or unidentified comparable form
 †Choristoceras
 †Choristoceras klamathense – type locality for species
 †Choristoceras marshi
 †Christitys – type locality for genus
 †Christitys delta – type locality for species
 †Christitys martini – or unidentified comparable form
 †Christitys medica – type locality for species
 †Cidarina
 †Cidarina beta – type locality for species
 †Cidarina cretacea – type locality for species
  Cidaris
 †Cidaris californicus
 †Cidaris plumasensis
 †Cidaris taylorensis
 †Cladoceramus
 †Cladoceramus undulatoplicatus
 †Clinura
 †Clinura anassa
 †Clisocolus
 †Clisocolus cordatus
 †Clisocolus corrugatus
 †Clisocolus dubius
  †Collignoniceras
 †Collignoniceras bakeri
 †Collonia
 †Collonia occidentalis – type locality for species
 †Cophocara
 †Cophocara stantoni
 †Coralliochama
 †Coralliochama orcutti
 Corbicula
 †Corbicula astartoides
 Corbula
 †Corbula cancellifera
 †Corbula parilis
 †Corbula pozo
 †Corbula torta – or unidentified comparable form
 †Corbula traski
 †Corbula traskii
 Cornutella
 †Cosmonautilus
 †Cosmonautilus dilleri
 †Cosmonautilus hersheyi – type locality for species
 †Cosmonautilus pacificus – type locality for species
 †Cosmonautilus shastensis – type locality for species
 †Costispiriferina
 †Costispiriferina pittensis
 †Courtilloticeras
 †Courtilloticeras stevensi – type locality for species
 Crassatella
 †Crassatella conradiana
 †Crassatella mercedensis – tentative report
 †Crassatella saulae
 †Crassatella triangulata
 †Crassatella triangulatus
 †Crassatellina
 †Crassatellina saulae
    †Crioceratites
 †Crioceratites latus
 †Crioceratites tehamaensis – or unidentified comparable form
 †Crolanium
 †Crolanium triquetrum
 †Crucella
 †Crucella linda
 †Crucella magna
 †Crucella messinae
 †Crucella theokaftensis
  Cucullaea
 †Cucullaea alamoensis – type locality for species
 †Cucullaea bowersiana
 †Cucullaea gravida
 †Cucullaea truncata
 †Cucullaea youngi
 †Cunningtoniceras
 †Cunningtoniceras meridionale – or unidentified related form
 †Cyclothyris
 †Cyclothyris densleonis
 Cylichna
 †Cylichna andersoni
 †Cylindroteuthis
  †Cymatoceras
 †Cymatoceras carlottense
 †Cymatoceras hermosus – type locality for species
 †Cymbophora
 †Cymbophora asburnerii
 †Cymbophora ashburnensis – or unidentified related form
 †Cymbophora ashburnerii
 †Cymbophora bella – or unidentified comparable form
 †Cymbophora gabbiana
 †Cymbophora popenoei
 †Cymbophora stantoni
 †Cymbophora tenuissima
 †Cymbophora triangula
 †Cymbophora triangulata
    †Cymbospondylus
 †Cymbospondylus petrinus
 †Cymulopora – tentative report
 †Cyprimeria
 †Cyprimeria moorei
 Cyrtocapsa – tentative report
 †Cyrtocapsa kisoensis – or unidentified related form

D

 †Damesites
 †Damesites damesi
 †Damesites frazierense
 †Damesites gardeni – or unidentified related form
 †Damesites hetonaiensis
 †Damesites richardsoni – type locality for species
 †Damesites subsugatum
  †Daonella – tentative report
 †Daonella dubia
 †Darvelus
 †Darvelus pessagnoi – type locality for species
 †Darvelus primus – type locality for species
 Dentalina
 †Dentalina legumen
  †Dentalium
 †Dentalium cooperi
 †Dentalium nanaimoense
 †Dentalium whiteavesi
  †Desmoceras
 †Desmoceras alamoense – or unidentified comparable form
 †Desmoceras argonauticum – or unidentified comparable form
 †Desmoceras dawsoni
 †Desmoceras inane
 †Desmoceras japonicum
 †Desmoceras voyi
 †Desmophyllites
 †Desmophyllites diphylloides – type locality for species
 †Deviatus
 †Deviatus deweveri
 †Deviatus hipposidericus
 †Diacanthocapsa
 †Dicerosaturnalis
 †Dicerosaturnalis dicranacanthos
 †Dicroa
 †Dicroloma
 †Dicroloma nodosa
 †Dictyoconites
 †Dictyoconites americanus – type locality for species
 †Dictyomitra
 †Dictyomitrella
 †Dictyomitrella kamoensis
  †Didymoceras
 †Didymoceras hornbyense – or unidentified comparable form
 †Didymoceras vancouverense – or unidentified comparable form
 †Didymoceras vancouverensis
 †Dieneria – type locality for genus
 †Dieneria arthaberi – type locality for species
 †Dieneroceras
 †Dieneroceras dieneri – type locality for species
 †Dieneroceras marcoui – type locality for species
 †Dieneroceras spathi
 †Dieneroceras subquadratum
 †Dillerites – type locality for genus
 †Dillerites shastensis – type locality for species
 †Dimyodon
 †Dimyodon storrsi – type locality for species
 †Diozoptyxis
 †Diozoptyxis ursana – type locality for species
 Diplodonta
 †Diplodonta davisi
 †Diplomoceras
 †Diplomoceras ellipticum
 †Diplomoceras jimboi – type locality for species
 †Diplomoceras mustangense – type locality for species
  †Discohelix – tentative report
 †Discohelix leana
 †Discophyllites
 †Discophyllites patens
 †Discoproptychites
 †Discoproptychites walcotti – type locality for species
  †Discoscaphites
 †Discotropites
 †Discotropites davisi – type locality for species
 †Discotropites formosus – type locality for species
 †Discotropites laurae
 †Discotropites lineatus
 †Discotropites mojsvarensis
 †Discotropites plinii
 †Discotropites sandlingensis
 †Discotropites sengeli
 †Discotropites smithi
 †Discotropites theron
 †Distichophyllia
 †Distichophyllia norica
  †Douvilleiceras
 †Douvilleiceras mammillatum – or unidentified comparable form
 †Drepanochilus
 †Drepanochilus transversus
 †Drilluta – tentative report
 †Droltus
 †Dumitricaella – tentative report
 †Dumitricaella cucurbitina – or unidentified related form
 †Durania
 †Durania californica – type locality for species

E

 †Echinocorys
 †Echinocorys yoloensis – type locality for species
 †Elimia
 †Elimia veatchii
 †Ellipsoscapha
 †Ellipsoscapha nortonensis – or unidentified comparable form
 †Ellipsoscapha skaios
 †Emiluvia
 †Emiluvia chica
 †Emiluvia dollarbendensis
 †Emiluvia fontana
 †Emiluvia hopsoni
 †Emiluvia lowercoonensis
 †Emiluvia nana
 †Emiluvia pessagnoi
 †Emiluvia premyogii
  †Enchodus
 †Endoptygma
 †Endoptygma hermax – type locality for species
  †Entobia
 †Entolium
 †Entolium equabile
 †Entolium meeki
 †Entolium pittensis – type locality for species
 †Eocomoseris
 †Eocomoseris ramosa
 †Eocypraea
 †Eocypraea louellae – type locality for species
 †Eodanubites
 †Eodanubites judae – type locality for species
 †Eogaudryceras
 †Eogaudryceras wintunius
 †Eogunnarites
 †Eogunnarites matsumotoi
 †Eospongosaturninus
 †Eospongosaturninus protoformis
 †Eripachla
 †Eripachla ponderosa
 †Eripachya
 †Eripachya ponderosa
 †Eriphyla
 †Eriphyla lapida
 †Eriphyla lapidus
 †Eriphyla umbonata
 †Etea
 †Etea occidentalis
  †Eucalycoceras
 †Eucalycoceras diabloense – type locality for species
  †Euclastes
 †Eucymatoceras
 †Eucymatoceras plicatum
 †Eucyrtidiellum
 †Eucyrtidiellum ptyctum
 †Eucyrtidiellum takemurai
 †Eucyrtidiellum unumaense
 †Eucyrtidium – tentative report
 †Euidothyris
 †Euidothyris lucerna – type locality for species
 †Euomphaloceras
 †Euomphaloceras septemseriatum
  †Eupachydiscus
 †Eupachydiscus arbucklensis – type locality for species
 †Eupachydiscus haradai
 †Eupachydiscus lamberti – or unidentified related form
 †Eupachydiscus willgreeni – type locality for species
 †Euspira
 †Euspira compressa
 †Euspira marianus
 †Euspira popenoei
 †Euspira shumardiana
  †Eutrephoceras
 †Eutrephoceras campbelli
  †Exiteloceras
 †Exiteloceras bennisoni – type locality for species
 †Exiteloceras desertense – type locality for species
 †Exiteloceras diabloense – tentative report
 †Exiteloceras ortigalitoense – type locality for species
 †Exiteloceras vancouverense
  †Exogyra

F

  †Fagesia
 †Fagesia catinus – type locality for species
 †Fagesia klamathensis – type locality for species
  Fissurella – tentative report
 †Flabellina
 †Flabellina pilulifera
 †Flabellirhynchia
 †Flabellirhynchia concinna – type locality for species
 †Flabellirhynchia falconis – type locality for species
 †Flabellum
 †Flabellum fresnoense – type locality for species
 †Flaventia
 †Flaventia lens
 †Foremanina
 †Francisciconcha
 †Francisciconcha maslennikovi
 †Fresnosaurus – type locality for genus
 †Fresnosaurus drescheri – type locality for species
 Frondicularia
 †Frondicularia undulosa – or unidentified comparable form

G

 †Gabbioceras
 †Gabbioceras angulatum
 †Garzasia
 †Garzasia diabla
 †Garzasia intermedia – or unidentified comparable form
  Gastrochaena – tentative report
  †Gaudryceras
 †Gaudryceras alamedense
 †Gaudryceras aureum – type locality for species
 †Gaudryceras cinctum – or unidentified related form
 †Gaudryceras debnabebse – or unidentified comparable form
 †Gaudryceras denmanense – or unidentified comparable form
 †Gaudryceras kayei – type locality for species
 †Gaudryceras tenuiliratum – tentative report
 †Gaudryceras texanum – type locality for species
  †Gervillia
 †Gervillia shastensis
 Glans – tentative report
 †Glans veneriformis
 †Glauconia
 †Globigerinelloides
 †Globirhynchia
 †Globirhynchia gnathophora – type locality for species
 †Globirhynchia oblatopinguis – type locality for species
 †Globirhynchia rhacta – type locality for species
 †Globirhynchia schucherti – type locality for species
 Glossus
 †Glossus delta
   Glycymeris
 †Glycymeris anae
 †Glycymeris apletos
 †Glycymeris banosensis – type locality for species
 †Glycymeris pacifica – or unidentified comparable form
 †Glycymeris pacificus
 †Glycymeris shastensis – type locality for species
 †Glycymeris suciensis
 †Glycymeris veatchii
 †Glycymeris yoloensis
 †Glyptoxoceras
 †Glyptoxoceras largesulcatum – or unidentified comparable form
 †Glyptoxoceras subcompressum – or unidentified comparable form
 †Gnathorhynchia
 †Gnathorhynchia perplicata – type locality for species
 †Gnomohalorites
 †Gnomohalorites americanus
 Gongylothorax
 †Gongylothorax oblongus – or unidentified related form
 †Goniojuvavites
 †Goniojuvavites kellyi – type locality for species
 †Gonionotites
 †Gonionotites northi – type locality for species
 †Gorgansium
 †Gorgansium pulchrum
 †Goricanites – type locality for genus
 †Goricanites noblei – type locality for species
    †Grallator
 †Grammatodon
 †Grammatodon vancouverensis
  †Gryphaea
 †Gryponautilus
 †Gryponautilus cooperi – type locality for species
 †Guexella
 †Guineana
 †Guineana alta
 †Guodunites
 †Guodunites hooveri – type locality for species
 †Gymnotropites
 †Gymnotropites americanus – type locality for species
 †Gymnotropites laevis – type locality for species
 †Gymnotropites rotundus – type locality for species
 Gyrodes
 †Gyrodes allisoni
 †Gyrodes californicus
 †Gyrodes canadensis
 †Gyrodes conradiana
 †Gyrodes dowelli
 †Gyrodes expansa
 †Gyrodes expansus
 †Gyrodes greeni – type locality for species
 †Gyrodes pacificum
 †Gyrodes pacificus – or unidentified comparable form
 †Gyrodes quercus
 Gyroidina
 †Gyroidina depressa

H

   Haliotis
 †Halobia
 †Halobia austriaca
 †Halobia cordillerana
 †Halobia gigantea
 †Halobia ornatissima
 †Halobia rugosa
 †Halobia superba
  †Hauericeras
 †Hauericeras angustum
 †Hauericeras churchi – type locality for species
 †Hauericeras mickeyi – type locality for species
 †Hauerites
 †Hauerites lawsoni – type locality for species
 †Haydenia
 †Haydenia impressa
 †Hecticoceras
  †Hedenstroemia
 †Hedenstroemia kossmati
 †Helena
 †Helena exquisita
 †Helicaulax
 †Helicaulax popenoei – type locality for species
 Hemiaster
 †Hemiaster californicus
  †Hemicidaris
 †Hemicidaris intumescens
 †Hemicryptocapsa
 †Hemicryptocapsa ruesti – or unidentified related form
   Heptranchias
 †Hertleinites
 †Hertleinites aguila
 †Hertleinites pecki
 †Heteroderma
 †Hexasaturnalis
 †Hexasaturnalis hexagonus
 †Hexasphaera
 †Hexasphaera baumgartneri
 †Higumastra
 †Higumastra boucoti
 †Higumastra devilsgapensis
 †Higumastra dumitricai
 †Higumastra imbricata
 †Higumastra inflata – or unidentified related form
 †Higumastra transversa
 †Hilarisirex
  Hipponix
 †Hipponix dichotomus
 †Hiscocapsa
 †Hiscocapsa acuta
 †Hiscocapsa japonica – or unidentified comparable form
 †Hiscocapsa robusta
 †Hokkaidoconcha
 †Hokkaidoconcha bilirata – type locality for species
 †Hokkaidoconcha morenoensis – type locality for species
 †Hokkaidoconcha occidentalis
 †Hokkaidoconcha tehamaensis – type locality for species
 †Holcodiscoides
 †Holcodiscoides gorrilli – type locality for species
 †Holcophylloceras – tentative report
 †Hollisites
 †Hollisites inflatus
 †Hollisites lucasi
 †Holocryptocanium
 †Holocryptocanium astiensis
 †Holocryptocanium barbui
 †Holocryptocanium geysersensis
 †Holocryptocanium tuberculatum
 †Homerites
 †Homerites semiglobosus
 †Homoeoparonaella
 †Homoeoparonaella barbata
 †Homoeoparonaella elegans
 †Homoeoparonaella gigantea
 †Homoeoparonaella glinesi
 †Homoeoparonaella radians
 †Homoeoparonaella scurrae
 †Homolsomites
 †Homolsomites mutabilis
 †Hoplocrioceras
 †Hoplocrioceras ducanense
 †Hoplocrioceras duncanense
 †Hoplocrioceras remondi
 †Hoplotropites
 †Hoplotropites jokelyi
 †Hormathospongia – type locality for genus
 †Hormathospongia dictyota – type locality for species
 †Hsuum
 †Hsuum baldfacense
 †Hsuum brevicostatum
 †Hsuum maxwelli
 †Hsuum mclaughlini
 †Hsuum naturale
 †Hsuum obispoensis
 †Hsuum rutogense
 †Hsuum santamariaense
 †Hsuum speciosum
    †Hybodus
 †Hybodus shastensis – type locality for species
 †Hydrotherosaurus – type locality for genus
 †Hydrotherosaurus alexandrae – type locality for species
 †Hyphantoceras
 †Hyphantoceras ceratopse
 †Hyphantoceras venustum – or unidentified comparable form
 †Hypophylloceras
 †Hypophylloceras onoense – or unidentified related form

I

 †Icantia
   †Ichthyornis
  †Ichthyosaurus
 †Ichthyosaurus californicus – type locality for species
 †Ichthyosaurus franciscanus – type locality for species
 †Igonoia
 †Igonoia shastana
 †Indonesites
 †Indonesites sphaericus
  †Inoceramus
 †Inoceramus aduncas
 †Inoceramus aduncus
 †Inoceramus amakusensis – or unidentified comparable form
 †Inoceramus angulatus – or unidentified comparable form
 †Inoceramus balticus
 †Inoceramus chicoensis – type locality for species
 †Inoceramus cordiformis – or unidentified comparable form
 †Inoceramus cymbaeformis – or unidentified related form
 †Inoceramus digitatus – or unidentified related form
 †Inoceramus ezoensis – or unidentified comparable form
 †Inoceramus glennensis
 †Inoceramus goldfussi – or unidentified comparable form
 †Inoceramus gradilis
 †Inoceramus incertus – or unidentified comparable form
 †Inoceramus jacksonensis – type locality for species
 †Inoceramus japonicus – or unidentified comparable form
 †Inoceramus klamathensis
 †Inoceramus naumanni
 †Inoceramus pembertoni – or unidentified related form
 †Inoceramus regularis – or unidentified related form
 †Inoceramus shikotanensis – or unidentified comparable form
 †Inoceramus stanislausensis
 †Inoceramus steinmanni – or unidentified comparable form
 †Inoceramus subundantus
 †Inoceramus subundatus
 †Inoceramus teshioensis – or unidentified comparable form
 †Inoceramus turgidus – type locality for species
 †Inoceramus vancouverensis
 †Inoceramus whitneyi – or unidentified related form
 †Inoperna
 †Inoperna bellarugosa
 †Inyoceras
 †Inyoceras bittneri – type locality for species
 †Inyoceras multicameratus – type locality for species
 †Inyoites – type locality for genus
 †Inyoites oweni – type locality for species
 Isocrinus
 †Isocrinus californicus
   Isognomon
 †Isognomon – type locality for species – informal

J

 †Jeanbesseiceras – tentative report
 †Jeanbesseiceras jacksoni
 †Joaquinites – type locality for genus
 †Joaquinites fascicostatum – type locality for species
 †Jovites
 †Jovites pacificus – type locality for species
 Jupiteria
 †Juvavites
 †Juvavites knowltoni
 †Juvavites subinterruptus
 †Juvenites
 †Juvenites dieneri – type locality for species

K

  †Kallirhynchia
 †Kallirhynchia phylarchus – type locality for species
 †Kallirhynchia valliculae – type locality for species
 †Katroma
 †Katroma neagui – or unidentified related form
 †Keyserlingites
 †Keyserlingites pacificus – type locality for species
 †Keyserlingites subrobustus
 †Kilianella
 †Kilianella crassiplicata
 †Kilinora
 †Kilinora catenarum
 †Kilinora spiralis
 †Klamathites
 †Klamathites kellyi
 †Klamathites schucherti – type locality for species
  †Kossmaticeras
 †Kossmaticeras japonicum – or unidentified related form
 †Kozurium
 †Kozurium corningensis
 †Kozurium zingulai
 †Kuhnastraea
 †Kuhnastraea decussata

L

 †Laballa
 †Laballa suessi – or unidentified comparable form
 †Lacunaria
 †Lacunaria striata
 †Lampasa
 †Lampasa blomei
 †Lanceolites – type locality for genus
 †Lanceolites bicarinatus
 †Lanceolites compactus
 †Lanubus
 Laternula – tentative report
 †Laternula alisoensis
 †Latidorsella
 †Latidorsella barryae – type locality for species
 †Latimaeandra – report made of unidentified related form or using admittedly obsolete nomenclature
 †Latimaeandra eucystis
 †Leconteia – type locality for genus
 †Leconteia californica – type locality for species
 †Leconteiceras
 †Leconteiceras occidentale – type locality for species
 †Leconteites
 †Leconteites lecontei – tentative report
 Leda – tentative report
 †Leda translucidus – tentative report
 †Legumen
 †Legumen ooides
 †Leptosolen
 †Leugeo
 †Leugeo ordinarius
 †Leugeo parvispinata
 †Levileugeo
 Lima
 †Lima – type locality for species A – informal
 †Lima beta
 †Lima costata
 †Lima kimballi – type locality for species
 †Lima terqueni
 Limopsis
 †Limopsis silveradoensis
 †Linaresia
 †Linearis
 †Linearis multicostata – or unidentified comparable form
  †Lingula
 †Lipmanium – tentative report
 †Lipmanium caseyi
 †Lisopithia
 †Lisopithia ana
 †Lispodesthes
 †Lispodesthes rotundatus
 †Lispodesthes rotundus
 †Lithiotis
 †Lithiotis problematica
 †Lithomphalus
 †Lithomphalus enderlini
  Lithophaga
 †Loboidothyris
 †Loboidothyris meeki – type locality for species
 †Loboidothyris mormonensis – type locality for species
 †Longoconcha – tentative report
  Lopha
 Loripes – tentative report
 †Loripes dubia
 †Loxo
 †Loxo decore
 †Lucina
 †Lyriochlamys
 †Lyriochlamys traskii
 †Lysis
 †Lysis californica
 †Lysis duplicosta
 †Lysis suciensis – or unidentified comparable form
  †Lytoceras
 †Lytoceras aulaeum
  †Lytoceras batesi
 †Lytoceras saturnale
 †Lytoceras traski – or unidentified comparable form
 †Lytoceras whitneyi

M

 Macrocallista
 †Macrocallista cordata – or unidentified related form
  †Macrocephalites
 †Madrasites
 †Madrasites voyanum – type locality for species
  †Mammites – tentative report
  †Mantelliceras
 †Mantelliceras lecontei – or unidentified comparable form
  Margarella
 †Margarella crenulata
 †Margariella – tentative report
 †Margaritella
 †Margaritella globosa
  Margarites
 †Margarites inornatus
 †Margarites ornatissima
 †Margarites senilis
 †Margarites septentrionalis – type locality for species
 †Margaritropites
 †Margaritropites johnsoni – type locality for species
 †Margaritropites kokeni – type locality for species
 †Marginotruncana
 †Marginotruncana marginata
 †Marginotruncana renzi
 Marginulina
 †Marginulina elongata
  †Mariella
 †Mariella bergeri
 †Mariella fricki
 Martesia
 †Martesia clausa
 †Mataxa
 †Mataxa arida – type locality for species
  †Mediaster
 †Mediaster hayi – type locality for species
 †Meekia
 †Meekia bella
 †Meekia daileyi
 †Meekia iberica
 †Meekia lirata – tentative report
 †Meekia louella
 †Meekia mygale
 †Meekia radiata
 †Meekia sella
 †Meekia takeoana – tentative report
 †Meekoceras
 †Meekoceras gracilitatis
 †Meekoceras newberryi
 †Meekoceras strongi
 †Melchiorites
 †Melchiorites shastensis
  †Menuites
 †Menuites arrialoorensis – or unidentified related form
 †Menuites siskiyouensis
 †Merriamia
 †Merriamia zitteli
 †Mesopuzosia
 †Mesopuzosia colusaense
 †Mesopuzosia intermedia – or unidentified comparable form
 †Mesopuzosia pacifica – or unidentified comparable form
 †Metacerithium – tentative report
 †Metaplacenticeras
 †Metaplacenticeras californicum
 †Metaplacenticeras pacificum
 †Metaplacenticeras transitionale
 †Metasibirites
 †Metasibirites brockensis – type locality for species
 †Metasibirites coei – type locality for species
 †Metasibirites frechi – type locality for species
 †Metasibirites gracilis – type locality for species
 †Metasibirites modestus – type locality for species
 †Metasibirites mojsvarensis – type locality for species
 †Metasibirites pusillus – type locality for species
 †Metasibirites pygmaeus – type locality for species
 †Metasibirites shastensis – type locality for species
 †Metatirolites
 †Metatirolites foliaceus
 †Metatirolites quadrangulus
 †Metatirolites subpygmaeus
 †Microsciadiocapsa
 †Microsciadiocapsa sutterensis
 †Microtropites
 †Microtropites tubercularis
 †Millerocaulis
 †Millerocaulis embreei – type locality for species
 †Minasteria – report made of unidentified related form or using admittedly obsolete nomenclature
 †Minasteria shastensis
 †Minocapsa
 †Minocapsa aitai
 †Minocapsa tansinhoki
 †Minytropis
 †Minytropis melilota
 †Mirifusus
 †Mirifusus baileyi
 †Mirifusus chenodes – or unidentified related form
 †Mirifusus fragilis
 †Mirifusus guadalupensis
 †Mirifusus mediodilatatus
 † Mita – tentative report
 † Mita
 †Mita magnifica
  †Modiolus
 †Modiolus cylindricus
 †Modiolus sikiyouensis
 †Modiolus siskiyouensis
 †Mojsvaroceras
 †Mojsvaroceras turneri – type locality for species
 †Monotis
 †Monotis subcircularis
 †Morenosaurus – type locality for genus
 †Morenosaurus stocki – type locality for species
   †Mortoniceras
 †Mortoniceras chicoense
 †Mortoniceras gainesana
 †Mortoniceras inflata
 †Mortoniceras kiliani
 †Mortoniceras tehamaensis
 †Msopuzosia
 †Msopuzosia densicostata – or unidentified comparable form
 †Murphitys – type locality for genus
 †Murphitys corona – type locality for species
 †Murphitys madonna – type locality for species
 †Murphitys michaeli – type locality for species
 Musculus – or unidentified related form
 †Myoconcha
 †Myoconcha nana
  †Myophorella
 †Myophorella argo
 †Myophorella dawsoni – or unidentified related form
 †Myophorella yellowstonensis
  †Myophoria
 †Myophoria brockensis – type locality for species
 Myrtea
 †Myrtea gabbi – tentative report
 †Mytiloides
 †Mytiloides labiatus
 †Mytiloides mytiloides
 †Mytiloides opalensis
 †Mytiloides stantoni – or unidentified comparable form
  †Mytilus
 †Mytilus pauperculus – or unidentified comparable form
 †Mytilus quadratus
 †Mytilus ursensis – type locality for species

N

 †Nanonavis
 †Nanonavis breweriana
 Napora
 †Napora bearensis – or unidentified comparable form
 †Napora bukryi
 †Napora collieri
 †Napora dumitricai
 †Napora durhami
 †Napora elkcampensis
 †Napora espinosa
 †Napora latissima – or unidentified related form
 †Napora lomoalta
 †Napora nipponica
 †Napora pacifica
 †Napora praespinifera
 †Napora pyramidalis
 †Napora redonda
 †Napora saginata – or unidentified related form
 †Napora sixi
 †Napora spinifera
  Natica
 †Natica allisoni
 †Natica conradiana
 †Navahopus
   †Nectosaurus
 †Neithea
 †Neithea grandicosta
 †Nelltia
 †Nelltia roddana – tentative report
 †Nelltia salsa – type locality for species
 †Nemodon
 †Neocardioceras – tentative report
  †Neohibolites
 †Neohibolites fontinalis
 †Neoparonaella
 †Neoparonaella delicata
 †Neophylloceras
 †Neophylloceras hetonaiense
 †Neophylloceras ramosum
 †Neophylloceras vaculae
 †Neopopanoceras
 †Neopopanoceras haugi – type locality for species
 †Neopuzosia
 †Neopuzosia ishikawai
  †Nerinea
 †Nerinea stewarti – type locality for species
 †Nerinella
 †Nerinella santana – type locality for species
  Nerita
 †Nerita orovillensis – tentative report
 Nodosarella
 Nodosaria
 †Nodosaria monile
 †Nodosaria pomuligera
 †Nodosaria spinifera
 †Nolita
 †Nolita ramosa
 †Nonactaeonina
 †Nonactaeonina obesa
 †Nonactaeonina tensa – or unidentified comparable form
  †Nostoceras
 †Nostoceras excelsus – type locality for species
 †Nostoceras splendidum
 †Notidanodon
 †Notidanodon lanceolatus
 †Notodonax
 †Notodonax bolsae
 †Novitripus
 †Novitripus placitus
 †Novitripus varius
 †Novixitus
 †Novixitus jurassicus
 †Novixitus mclaughlini
 †Nowakites
 †Nowakites dobbinsi – type locality for species
 †Nowakites klamathonis – type locality for species
 †Nowakites puertoensis – type locality for species
 †Nowakites rumseyensis – type locality for species
 Nucinella
 Nucleolites – report made of unidentified related form or using admittedly obsolete nomenclature
 †Nucleolites mercedensis
   Nucula
 †Nucula gabbi
 †Nucula storrsi
 Nuculana
 †Nuculana grandensis – or unidentified related form
 †Nuculana translucida
 †Nudivagus – tentative report
 †Nudivagus califus – type locality for species

O

 †Obesacapsula
 †Obesacapsula cetia
 †Obesacapsula morroensis
 †Obesacapsula rotunda
 †Obnixia – type locality for genus
 †Obnixia thaynesiana
 †Octopodichnus
 †Olanda
 †Olanda olorina
 †Omphaloptycha
 †Omphaloptycha obesa – type locality for species
 †Omphaloptycha shastensis – type locality for species
 Opalia
 †Ophiceras
 †Ophiceras involutum
 †Opis
 †Opis anae – type locality for species
 †Opis californica – type locality for species
 †Opis holzana
 †Opis pacifica
 †Opis popenoei – type locality for species
 †Opis rosarioensis
 †Opis triangulata – type locality for species
 †Opis vancouverensis
 †Orbiculiforma
 †Orbiculiforma maxima
 †Orbiculiforma multangula
 †Orbiculiforma nevadaensis
 †Orbiculiforma railensis
 †Orbiculiformella
 †Orbiculiformella teres
 †Ornithella
 †Ornithella curticensis – type locality for species
 †Ornithella gemina – type locality for species
 †Ornithella syringothyrides – type locality for species
  †Orthoceras
 †Orthoceras shastense – type locality for species
 †Orthotrigonia
   Ostrea
 †Ostrea crescentica
  †Owenites
 †Owenites carpenteri
 †Owenites koeneni – type locality for species
 †Oxybeloceras
 †Oxybeloceras petrolense
 †Oxybeloceras taffi – type locality for species
 †Oxyeurax
 †Oxyeurax trapezoidalis
 †Oxynautilus
 †Oxynautilus acutus
 †Oxytoma
 †Oxytropidoceras
 †Oxytropidoceras peruvianum

P

 †Pachecocrinus
  †Pachydesmoceras
 †Pachydesmoceras colusaense
 †Pachydesmoceras pachydiscoide – type locality for species
  †Pachydiscus
 †Pachydiscus ashlandicus – or unidentified related form
 †Pachydiscus averilli – type locality for species
 †Pachydiscus binodatus – or unidentified comparable form
 †Pachydiscus buckhami
 †Pachydiscus catarinae – or unidentified related form
 †Pachydiscus coalingense
 †Pachydiscus egertoni – or unidentified comparable form
 †Pachydiscus henleyensis
 †Pachydiscus japonicus – or unidentified comparable form
 †Pachydiscus neevesi – or unidentified comparable form
 †Pachydiscus ootacodensis
 †Pachydiscus subcompressus
 †Pachyoncus
 †Pachyoncus kamiasoensis
 †Paladmete – tentative report
 †Palaeastraea – report made of unidentified related form or using admittedly obsolete nomenclature
 †Palaeastraea grandissima
 †Palaeobates
 †Palaeobates shastensis – type locality for species
 †Palaeocypraea
 †Palaeocypraea fontana – type locality for species
 †Palaeocypraea wilfredi – type locality for species
 †Palaeomoera
 †Palaeomoera dyskritos
 †Paleopsephaea
 †Paleopsephaea sacramentica
 †Paleotractus
 †Paleotractus crassus
 †Palinandromeda
 †Palinandromeda fimbria
 †Palinandromeda podbielensis
 Panopea
 †Panopea californica – or unidentified related form
 †Pantanellium
 †Pantanellium buntonense – or unidentified comparable form
 †Pantanellium darlingtonense
 †Pantanellium deflectum
 †Pantanellium fishcreekensis
 †Pantanellium foveatum
 †Pantanellium josephinense
 †Pantanellium meraceibaense
 †Pantanellium rarum
 †Pantanellium riedeli
 †Pantanellium squinaboli
 †Pantanellium ultrasincerum
 †Paraganides – type locality for genus
 †Paraganides californicus – type locality for species
 †Parahauerites
 †Parahauerites ashleyi – type locality for species
 †Parahoplites
 †Parahoplites sjogreni – or unidentified related form
 †Parahsuum
 †Parahsuum izeense
 †Parahsuum mostleri
 †Parahsuum ovale
 †Parahsuum publicum
 †Parahsuum simplum
 †Parahsuum stanleyense
 †Parahsuum transiens – or unidentified comparable form
 †Parallelodon
 †Parallelodon brewerianus
 †Parallelodon vancouverensis
 †Paranannites
 †Paranannites oviformis – type locality for species
 †Parapachydiscus
 †Parapachydiscus bidwelli – type locality for species
 †Parapachydiscus catarinae
 †Parapachydiscus cortinaensis – type locality for species
 †Parapachydiscus panochensis – type locality for species
 †Parapachydiscus peninsularis – or unidentified related form
 †Parapachydiscus stanislausensis – type locality for species
  †Parapuzosia
 †Parapuzosia arenaica – type locality for species
 †Parapuzosia giganteum – type locality for species
 †Parapuzosia hearni – type locality for species
 †Parapuzosia hindsi – type locality for species
 †Parapuzosia klamathonrae – type locality for species
 †Parapuzosia waringi
 †Paratropites
 †Paratropites colei
 †Paratropites shastensis
 †Parisculites
 †Parisculites obolinus
 †Paronaella
 †Paronaella aranae
 †Paronaella bandyi
 †Paronaella broennimanni – or unidentified related form
 †Paronaella cleopatraensis
 †Paronaella coalescenda
 †Paronaella egregia
 †Paronaella inornata
 †Paronaella nipomoensis
 †Paronaella obesa
 †Paronaella panda
 †Paronaella solanoensis – or unidentified comparable form
 †Partschiceras
 †Partschiceras grantzi – or unidentified comparable form
 †Parussuria
 †Parussuria compressa – type locality for species
 Parvamussium
 †Parvicingula
 †Parvicingula alamoensis
 †Parvicingula blowi
 †Parvicingula bluefordae
 †Parvicingula boesi
 †Parvicingula broqueta
 †Parvicingula citae
 †Parvicingula colemani
 †Parvicingula corona
 †Parvicingula cuyamaensis
 †Parvicingula deadhorsensis
 †Parvicingula dhimenaensis – or unidentified related form
 †Parvicingula excelsa
 †Parvicingula gorda
 †Parvicingula gracila
 †Parvicingula jonesi
 †Parvicingula khabakovi – or unidentified comparable form
 †Parvicingula obstinata
 †Parvicingula rothwelli
 †Parvicingula sanfilippoae
 †Parvicingula satura
 †Parvicingula thomesensis
 †Parvicingula turrita
 †Parvicingula whalenae
 †Parvicingula yehae
 †Parvivacca
 †Parvivacca coraforma
 †Parvivacca immodica
 †Parvivacca marina
 †Parvivacca robusta
 †Parvivacca simplex
 †Parvivacca varica
 †Paskentana
 †Paskentana berryessaensis – type locality for species
 †Paskentana globosa – type locality for species
 †Paskentana paskentaensis
 Patella – report made of unidentified related form or using admittedly obsolete nomenclature
 †Patella sheehani – type locality for species
 †Patella stuarti – type locality for species
 †Patulibracchium
 †Patulibracchium grapevinensis
 †Patulibracchium henlei – or unidentified related form
 †Paxitropis
 †Paxitropis dicriota
   †Pecten
 †Pecten cowperi
 †Pecten deformis – type locality for species
 †Pedalion
 †Pegaster – type locality for genus
 †Pegaster stichos – type locality for species
 †Pentacrinus
 †Pentacrinus asteriscus – tentative report
 †Pentzia
 †Pentzia hilgardi
 Periploma
 †Periploma subgracile – or unidentified related form
 †Periplomya – tentative report
 †Perispyridium
 †Perispyridium alinchakense – or unidentified related form
 †Perispyridium bacatum
 †Perispyridium dangerpointense
 †Perispyridium gujohachimanense
 †Perispyridium neotamanense
 †Perispyridium ordinarium
 †Perissitys
 †Perissitys brevirostris
 †Perissitys colocara – type locality for species
 †Perissitys cretacea
 †Perissitys elaphia – type locality for species
 †Perissitys pacifica – type locality for species
 †Perissitys stantoni
  †Peroniceras
 †Peroniceras leei – or unidentified related form
 †Peroniceras shastensis
 †Pervinquieria
 †Pervinquieria furberi – type locality for species
 †Pervinquieria gainesana – type locality for species
 †Petasiforma
 †Petasiforma foremanae
 †Petasiforma inusitata
 Phanerolepida
 †Phanerolepida onoensis – type locality for species
 †Phantum
 †Phantum insperatum – or unidentified comparable form
 Pharella
 †Pharella alta
 †Phelopteria
 †Phillippiella
  Pholadomya
 †Pholadomya diegoensis – or unidentified comparable form
 †Pholadomya subelongata
  †Phylloceras
 †Phylloceras gargantuum – type locality for species
 †Phylloceras pachecoense – type locality for species
 †Phylloceras velledae
  †Phyllopachyceras
 †Phyllopachyceras aldersona
 †Piarorhynchia
 †Piarorhynchia howardi – type locality for species
 †Piarorhynchia winnemae – type locality for species
 †Piestochilus – tentative report
 †Pinacoceras
 †Pinacoceras rex
  †Pinna
 †Pinna calamitoides
 †Pinna expansa – or unidentified comparable form
 †Pityostrobus
 †Pityostrobus calforniensis – type locality for species
  †Plesiotylosaurus
 †Plesiotylosaurus crassidens
 †Pleuromya
 †Pleurotropites
 †Pleurotropites gabbi – type locality for species
 †Pleurotropites gracilis – type locality for species
 Plicatula
 †Plicatula perimbricata
 †Plicatula variata
     †Plotosaurus
 †Plotosaurus bennisoni
 †Plotosaurus tuckeri
 †Podobursa
 †Podobursa basilica
 †Podobursa helvetica
 †Podobursa lanza
 †Podobursa rosea
 †Podobursa spinellifera
 †Podobursa spinosa
 †Podobursa tamanensis
 †Podobursa triacantha
 †Podocapsa
 †Podocapsa amphitreptera
    Polinices
 †Polinices mercedensis – type locality for species
 †Polinices shumardianus – tentative report
 †Polycyclus
 †Polycyclus henseli
 †Polyptychites
 †Polyptychites trichotomus
   †Polyptychoceras
 †Polyptychoceras obstrictum – or unidentified comparable form
 †Posidonia
 †Posidonia alpina
 †Posidonia jacksoni – type locality for species
 †Posidonia madisonensis – type locality for species
   †Potamides – tentative report
 †Potamides diadema
 †Potamides grovesi – type locality for species
 †Praeconocaryomma
 †Praeconocaryomma decora – or unidentified comparable form
 †Praeconocaryomma fasciata – tentative report
 †Praeconocaryomma immodica
 †Praeconocaryomma magnimamma – or unidentified comparable form
 †Praeconocaryomma media – or unidentified comparable form
 †Praeconocaryomma parvimamma – or unidentified comparable form
 †Praeconocaryomma prisca
 †Praeconocaryomma uhlensis
 †Praeconocaryomma whiteavesi – or unidentified comparable form
 †Praeconosphaera
 †Praeconosphaera spinosa
 †Praeparvicingula
 †Praeparvicingula decora
 †Praeparvicingula discors – or unidentified related form
 †Praeparvicingula gemmata
 †Praeparvicingula holdsworthi
 †Praeparvicingula hurdygurdyensis
 †Praeparvicingula nebulosa
 †Praeparvicingula packsaddlensis
 †Praeparvicingula rotunda
 †Praeparvicingula saltata
 †Praeparvicingula sencilla
 †Praeparvicingula siskiyouensis
 †Praeparvicingula turpicula
 †Praewilliriedellum
 †Praewilliriedellum cephalospinosum
 †Preflorianites
 †Preflorianites strongi – type locality for species
 †Preflorianites toulai
 †Prionocycloceras
 †Prionocycloceras californicum
 †Prionocycloceras crenulatum
 †Prionolobus
 †Prionolobus waageni – type locality for species
 †Prionotropis
 †Prionotropis casperi
 †Prionotropis hiltensis – type locality for species
 †Priscoficus – tentative report
 †Prisconatica
 †Prisconatica hesperia
 †Proarcestes
 †Proarcestes carpenteri – type locality for species
 †Proarcestes pacificus
 †Proarcestes shastensis – type locality for species
 †Proarcestes traski – type locality for species
 †Proarcestes whitneyi
 †Proarcestes winnemae – type locality for species
 †Proclydonautilus
 †Proclydonautilus hessi – type locality for species
 †Proclydonautilus spirolobus
 †Proclydonautilus squawensis – type locality for species
 †Proclydonautilus stantoni – type locality for species
 †Proclydonautilus triadicus
 †Proclydonautilus ursensis – type locality for species
  †Prognathodon
 †Prognathodon waiparaensis – or unidentified comparable form
 †Projuvavites
 †Projuvavites brockensis – type locality for species
 †Projuvavites strongi – type locality for species
  Propeamussium
 †Prosphingitoides
 †Prosphingitoides austini – type locality for species
 †Protexanites
 †Protexanites thompsoni
 †Protocardia
 †Protocardia remondianum
 †Protocardia translucidum
 †Protovallupus
 †Protovallupus tetlamaensis
  †Protrachyceras
 †Protrachyceras storrsi – type locality for species
 †Protunuma
 †Protunuma japonicus
 †Protunuma multicostatus – or unidentified related form
 †Pseudacrochordiceras
 †Pseudacrochordiceras inyoense – type locality for species
 †Pseudanchura
 †Pseudanchura biangulata
 †Pseudhelicoceras
 †Pseudhelicoceras petersoni – type locality for species
 †Pseudocrucella
 †Pseudocrucella ehrenbergi
 †Pseudocymia – type locality for genus
 †Pseudocymia aitha – type locality for species
 †Pseudocymia aurora – type locality for species
 †Pseudocymia cahalli – type locality for species
 †Pseudodiadema
 †Pseudodiadema emersoni
 †Pseudodictyomitra
 †Pseudodictyomitra lodogaensis
 †Pseudodictyomitra pentacolaensis
 †Pseudodictyomitra pseudomacrocephala
 †Pseudodictyomitra vestalensis
 †Pseudoeucyrtis
 †Pseudoeucyrtis firmus
 †Pseudoeucyrtis hannai – or unidentified comparable form
 †Pseudoeucyrtis paskentaensis
 †Pseudogaleodea
 †Pseudoheliodiscus
  †Pseudomelania
 †Pseudomelania colusaensis – type locality for species
 †Pseudoperna
 †Pseudoperna toxidonta
 †Pseudophyllites
 †Pseudoptera – tentative report
 †Pseudoristola
 †Pseudoristola clava
 †Pseudoristola nova
 †Pseudosageceras
 †Pseudosageceras multilobatum
  †Pseudothurmannia – tentative report
 †Pseudothurmannia jupiter
 †Pseudothurmannia russelli
 †Pseudoxybeloceras
 †Pseudoxybeloceras lineatum – or unidentified comparable form
 †Pteraichnus
 †Pteroluter
 †Pteroluter othnius – type locality for species
  †Pterotrigonia
 †Pterotrigonia evansana
 †Pterotrigonia klamathonia
 †Pterotrigonia oregana – or unidentified comparable form
 †Ptilorhynchia – type locality for genus
 †Ptilorhynchia plumasensis – type locality for species
 †Ptiloteuthis – type locality for genus
 †Ptiloteuthis foliatus – type locality for species
 †Ptychoceras – type locality for genus
 †Ptychoceras laeve – type locality for species
 †Ptyctothyris
 †Ptyctothyris hardgravensis – type locality for species
 †Ptyctothyris phlegethontis – type locality for species
 †Pugnellus
 †Pugnellus hammulus – or unidentified related form
 †Pugnellus hamulus
 †Pugnellus manubriatus
  †Puzosia
 †Puzosia hannai – type locality for species
 †Puzosia puma
 †Puzosia sullivanae
  Pycnodonte
 †Pyktes
 †Pyktes hamulus
 †Pyramispongia
 †Pyramispongia glascockensis
 †Pyropsis

Q

 Quadrans – tentative report
 †Quinquecapsularia
 †Quinquecapsularia spinosa

R

 †Radioceras
 †Radioceras evolvens
 †Remondia
 †Remondia oregonensis – type locality for species
 †Reptolunulites
 Retusa
 †Rhabdoceras
 †Rhabdoceras suessi
 †Rhactorhynchia
 †Rhactorhynchia trigona – type locality for species
 †Rhaetina – tentative report
 †Rhaetina pyriformis
 †Rhectomax
 †Rhectomax undulatus
 †Rhectomyax
 †Rhectomyax undulatus
  †Rhynchonella
 †Rhynchonella richardsoni – type locality for species
 †Rhynchonella varians – or unidentified comparable form
 †Riedelius
 †Ristola
 †Ristola altissima
 †Ristola bala
 †Ristola procera
 †Ristola turpicula
 Robulus
 †Robulus inornatus
  Rogerella
 †Romaniceras
 †Romaniceras deverioide

S

 †Sagenites
 †Sagenites dickersoni – type locality for species
 †Saghalinites
 †Sandlingites
 †Sandlingites andersoni – type locality for species
 †Sandlingites oribasus
 †Sarasinella
 †Sarasinella angulata
 †Saturniforma
 †Saturniforma peregrina
  †Scalarites
  †Scapanorhynchus
  Scaphander
 †Scaphander costatus
  †Scaphites
 †Scaphites hippocrepis – or unidentified related form
 †Scaphites inermis – or unidentified related form
 †Scaphites pittensis – type locality for species
 †Scaphotrigonia
 †Scaphotrigonia naviformis
 †Sciponoceras
 †Sciponoceras gracile – type locality for species
 Scobinella
 †Scobinella dilleri
 †Semihsuum
 †Semihsuum biscuithillense
 †Semihsuum brokencotense
 †Semihsuum inexploratum
 †Semihsuum sourdoughense
 †Senis
 Septifer
  †Sequoia
 †Sequoia reichenbachi
  Serpula
  †Shastasaurus
 †Shastasaurus alexandrae
 †Shastasaurus pacificus
 †Shasticrioceras
 †Shasticrioceras whitneyi – or unidentified related form
 †Shastites
 †Shastites compactus – type locality for species
 †Shastites compressus – type locality for species
 †Shastites whitneyi – type locality for species
  †Shastoceras
 †Silberlingia
 †Silberlingia sanctaeanae
 †Simbirskites
 †Simbirskites broadi
 †Simbirskites lecontei
  Siphonalia
 †Siphonalia dubius
 †Sirenites
 †Sirenites lawsoni – type locality for species
  †Skolithos
 Solariella
 †Solariella occidentalis
 †Solariella stewarti
 Solemya – tentative report
 Solen
 †Solen cuneatus – or unidentified comparable form
 †Solenoceras
 †Spiriferina – report made of unidentified related form or using admittedly obsolete nomenclature
 †Spiriferina coreyi – type locality for species
 †Spirigera – report made of unidentified related form or using admittedly obsolete nomenclature
 †Spirigera milesi – type locality for species
 †Spirogmoceras
 †Spirogmoceras shastense – type locality for species
 †Spondylospira
 †Spondylospira lewesensis
 †Spondylospira parmata
 Spondylus
 †Spondylus subnodosus
 †Spongiomorpha
 †Spongiomorpha tenuis
 †Spongocapsula
 †Spongocapsula dumitricai
 †Spongocapsula hooveri
 †Spongocapsula palmerae
 †Spongocapsula zamoraensis
 †Spongosaturninus
 †Spongosaturninus bispinus
  Squalicorax
 †Staurolonche
 Stichocapsa
 †Stichocapsa convexa
 †Stichocapsa japonica
 Stichomitra – tentative report
 †Stichomitra takanoensis
 †Stoliczkaia
 †Stoliczkaia praecursor – type locality for species
 †Stomechinus
 †Stomechinus hyatti
 †Striatojaponocapsa
 †Striatojaponocapsa conexa
 †Striatojaponocapsa plicarum
 †Stromatomorpha
 †Stromatomorpha californica – type locality for species
 †Sturia
 †Sturia woodini
 †Subhungarites
 †Subhungarites yatesi – type locality for species
 †Submeekoceras
 †Submeekoceras mushbachanum
 †Submortoniceras
 †Submortoniceras buttense
 †Submortoniceras buttensis – type locality for species
 †Submortoniceras chicoense
 †Submortoniceras gabbi
 †Submortoniceras pentzanum – type locality for species
 †Submortoniceras randalli
 †Submortoniceras studleyi
 †Subprinocyclus
 †Subprionocyclus
 †Subprionocyclus branneri
 †Subprionocyclus neptuni – or unidentified comparable form
 †Subprionocyclus normalis – or unidentified comparable form
 †Subprionocyclus oregonense
 † Suna
 †Suna ehrenbergi
 †Suna haeckeli
 †Suna harperi
 †Sympolycyclus
 †Sympolycyclus kellyi – type locality for species
 †Sympolycyclus nodifer – type locality for species
 †Syncyclonema
 †Syncyclonema latum – type locality for species
 †Syncyclonema operculiformis

T

 †Tappanella
 †Tappanella novacubica
 †Tardeceras – type locality for genus
 †Tardeceras parvum – type locality for species
 †Tegula
 †Tegula jeanae
 †Tehamatea
 †Tehamatea ovalis
 †Teichertus
 †Teichertus cavernosus
 †Teichertus notus
  Tellina
 †Tellina – type locality for species A – informal
 †Tellina alisoensis
 †Tellina ashburnerii
 †Tellina ooides
 †Tellina paralis
 †Tellina quadrata
 †Tellina whitneyi
 †Tenea
 †Tenea inflata
 †Teneposita – type locality for genus
 †Teneposita laeva – type locality for species
  Terebralia – tentative report
 †Terebralia juliana
 Terebratella
 †Terebratella densleonis
 Terebratulina
 †Terebratulina indomita – type locality for species
 †Tessarolax
 †Tessarolax distorta
 †Tessarolax trinalis
 †Tethysetta
 †Tethysetta boesii
 †Tetracapsa
 †Tetracapsa horokanaiensis
 †Tetraditryma
 †Tetraditryma coldspringensis
 †Tetraditryma corralitosensis
 †Tetraditryma oregonensis
 †Tetraditryma praeplena
 †Tetraditryma pseudoplena
 †Tetragonites
 †Tetragonites cala
 †Tetragonites epigonum
 †Tetragonites glabrus – or unidentified comparable form
 †Tetragonites popetensis – type locality for species
 †Tetrahoplitoides
 †Tetrahoplitoides stantoni
  †Thalattosaurus
 †Thanarla
 †Thanarla brouweri
 †Thanarla elegantissima
 †Thanarla praeveneta
 †Thanarla veneta
 †Thetironia
 †Thetironia annulata
 †Thisbites
 †Thisbites uhligi
 †Thurmanniceras
 †Thurmanniceras californicum
 †Thurmanniceras jenkinsi
 †Thurmanniceras stippi
 Thyasira
 †Thyasira cretacea
 †Tibetothyris – report made of unidentified related form or using admittedly obsolete nomenclature
 †Tibetothyris julica
 †Tibiaporrhais – tentative report
 †Tollia
 †Tollia giganteus
 †Tornatellaea
 †Tornatellaea impressa
 †Tornquistites – type locality for genus
 †Tornquistites evolutus – type locality for species
 †Trachybaculites
 †Trachybaculites columna
 †Trachysagenites
 †Trachysagenites erinaceus
 †Trachysagenites herbichi
 †Trachysagenites shastensis – type locality for species
 †Trachystenoceras
 †Trachystenoceras gabbi – type locality for species
 †Tragodesmoceras
 †Tragodesmoceras ashlandicum
 †Trajanella
 †Trajanella californica
 †Transhsuum
 †Transhsuum brevicostatum
 †Traskites
 †Traskites americanus – type locality for species
 †Traskites californicus – type locality for species
 †Traskites evolutus – type locality for species
 †Traskites fairbanksi – type locality for species
 †Traskites minutus – type locality for species
 †Traskites nanus – type locality for species
 †Traskites osmonti – type locality for species
 †Traskites robustus – type locality for species
 †Traskites rugosus – type locality for species
 †Traskites stantoni – type locality for species
 †Traskites tornquisti – type locality for species
 †Triactoma
 †Triactoma blakei
 †Triactoma jonesi
 †Triactoma kellumi
 †Triactoma longoriai
 †Trichinopolia
 †Trichinopolia californica – type locality for species
 Tricolocapsa
 †Trigonarca
 †Trigonarca californica – or unidentified related form
 †Trigonarca californicus
 †Trigonarca excavata
   †Trigonia
 †Trigonia aequicostata
 †Trigonia denticulata – or unidentified comparable form
 †Trigonia evansana
 †Trigonia fitchi
 †Trigonia hemisphaerica – or unidentified related form
 †Trigonia hemphilli
 †Trigonia inezana – or unidentified related form
 †Trigonia jacksonensis – type locality for species
 †Trigonia leana
 †Trigonia perrinsmithi – type locality for species
 †Trigonia plumasensis – type locality for species. Later reclassified in the new genus Californigonia as C. plumasensis.
 †Trigonia spinulosa – or unidentified comparable form
 †Trigonia tryoniana
 †Trigonia undulata
 †Trigonia vcostata – or unidentified comparable form
 †Trigonocallista
 †Trigonocallista bowersiana
 †Trigonocallista nitida
 †Trigonocallista varians
 †Trillus
 †Trillus elkhornensis
 †Trillus seiderense – or unidentified comparable form
 †Trinacria
 †Trinacria cor
 †Tripocyclia
 †Tripocyclia brooksi
 †Tripocyclia foremanae
 †Tripocyclia frenchflatensis
 †Tripocyclia highdomensis
 †Tripocyclia mascula
 †Tripocyclia saleebyi
 †Tritrabs
 †Tritrabs casmaliaensis
 †Tritrabs ewingi
 †Tritrabs exotica
 †Tritrabs hayi
 †Tritrabs rhododactylus
 †Tritrabs suavia
 †Tritrabs worzeli
 †Triversus
 †Triversus fastigatus
  †Trochactaeon
 †Trochactaeon frazierensis
 †Trochactaeon packardi
 Trochocyathus
 †Trochocyathus pergranulatus – type locality for species
  Trophon
 †Trophon condoni
 †Tropiceltites
 †Tropiceltites caducus
 †Tropites
 †Tropites arthaberi
 †Tropites brockensis – type locality for species
 †Tropites dieneri – type locality for species
 †Tropites dilleri – type locality for species
 †Tropites fusobullatus
 †Tropites hessi – type locality for species
 †Tropites keili
 †Tropites kellyi – type locality for species
 †Tropites mojsvarensis – type locality for species
 †Tropites morani – type locality for species
 †Tropites reticulatus
 †Tropites rotatorius – type locality for species
 †Tropites rothpletzi – type locality for species
 †Tropites schellwieni – type locality for species
 †Tropites shastensis – type locality for species
 †Tropites stearnsi – type locality for species
 †Tropites ursensis – type locality for species
 †Tropites welleri – type locality for species
 †Tropites wodani
 †Turanta
 †Turanta chetcoensis
 †Turanta flexa
 †Turanta luminosa
 †Turanta okamurai – or unidentified comparable form
  †Turrilites
 †Turrilites acutus
 †Turrilites costatus – or unidentified comparable form
 †Turrilites petersoni – type locality for species
   Turritella
 †Turritella chaneyi
 †Turritella chicoensis
 †Turritella hearni
 †Turritella infralineata
 †Turritella peninsularis – or unidentified related form
 †Turritella pescaderoensis
 †Turritella peterseni – or unidentified related form
 †Turritella petersoni
 †Turritella robertiana – or unidentified comparable form
 †Turritella webbi
 †Turritella xylina
 †Tylostoma
 †Tylostoma garzana – type locality for species

U

 †Unuma
 †Unuma echinatus
 †Unuma gordus
 †Unuma typicus

V

 †Vallupus
 †Vallupus hopsoni
 †Vaugonia
 †Vaugonia kobayashii – or unidentified comparable form
 †Vaugonia obliqua
 †Vaugonia yukonensis – tentative report
 †Vitorfus
 †Vitorfus campbelli
 Volsella
 †Volsella siskiyouensis
 †Volutoderma
 †Volutoderma averilli
 †Volutoderma averillii
 †Volutoderma californica
 †Volutoderma dilleri
 †Volutoderma gabbi
 †Volutoderma jacksonensis
 †Volutoderma magna
 †Volutoderma santana

W

 †Wilbertopora
 †Wilbertopora sannerae – type locality for species
 †Willimactra
 †Willimactra mathewsonii
 †Willimactra popenoei
 †Willimactra putida
 †Willimactra truncata
 †Williriedellum
 †Williriedellum carpathicum
 †Williriedellum frequens
 †Williriedellum madstonense
 †Wilvemia
 †Wilvemia whiskeyensis
 †Worthenia
 †Worthenia klamathensis – type locality for species
 †Wrangellium
 †Wyomingites
 †Wyomingites aplanatus

X

 †Xiphostylus
 †Xiphostylus gasquetensis
 †Xiphostylus humboldtensis
 †Xitus
 †Xitus antelopensis
 †Xitus antiquus
 †Xitus plenus
 †Xitus pulcher
 †Xitus singularis
 †Xitus spicularius
 †Xitus spineus

Y

 †Yaadia
 †Yaadia branii – or unidentified comparable form
 †Yaadia hemphilli
 †Yaadia robusta
 †Yaadia tryoniana
 †Yezoites
 †Yezoites puerculus – or unidentified comparable form
 Yoldia
 †Yoldia diminutiva
 †Yoldia leana
 †Yoldia nasuta

Z

 †Zanola
 †Zanola cornuta – or unidentified comparable form
 †Zartus
 †Zealandites
 †Zhamoidellum
 †Zhamoidellum exquisita
 †Zhamoidellum kiesslingi
 †Zhamoidellum kozuri
 †Zhamoidellum parva
 †Zhamoidellum triangulosa
 †Zifondium
 †Zifondium lassenensis
 †Zifondium paupera
 †Zimmerella – type locality for genus
 †Zimmerella eastoni
 †Zinsitys – tentative report
 †Zugmayerella
 †Zugmayerella americana
 †Zugmeyeria

References

 

Mesozoic
California
Life